Rogersville is a community in Northumberland County, New Brunswick, built around the Intersection of New Brunswick Route 126 and New Brunswick Route 440. It was an incorporated village until the end of 2022.

History

The village is named in honour of the Roman Catholic Bishop, the Most Reverend James Rogers, late Bishop of Chatham, New Brunswick. Rogersville is the home of two Trappist (Order of Cistercians of the Strict Observance) monasteries, Notre-Dame de l'Assomption Abbey (Our Lady of the Assumption Abbey for women) and Notre Dame du Calvaire Abbey (Our Lady of Calvary Abbey for men).

It is also the burial place of the man considered the Father of Modern Acadia—(Bishop) Monseigneur Marcel-Francois Richard, and the site of a monument containing his sarcophagus.

On 1 January 2023, Rogersville annexed all or part of seven local service districts to form the new village of Nouvelle-Arcadie. The community's name remains in official use.

Present day
It is served by Via Rail's train the Ocean which stops at the Rogersville railway station.

Demographics

Population trend 

Income (2015)

Mother tongue (2016)

Places of note
 Co-Op store
 Ocean Spray Cranberry Fields

Border communities
 Acadie Siding
 Pleasant Ridge
 Collette
 Shediac Ridge
 Saint-Athanase
 Saint-Pierre
 Sapin-Court
 Young Ridge

Notable people

See also
List of communities in New Brunswick

References

External links
 Official website

Communities in Northumberland County, New Brunswick
Former villages in New Brunswick